Andoni Zubizarreta Urreta (born 23 October 1961) is a Spanish former professional footballer who played as a goalkeeper.

The all-time most capped player for the Spain national team between 1998 and 2011, he played with individual and team success for Athletic Bilbao and Barcelona (eight years with the latter, he would later work with the club in directorial capacities), appearing in more than 950 official professional matches during his club career and holding the records for most appearances and clean sheets in La Liga for several years.

Zubizarreta represented Spain in seven major international tournaments, four World Cups and three European Championships, starting in six of those. He won the European Cup with Barcelona in 1992 and six La Liga titles, two with Athletic and four with Barcelona.

Club career

Athletic Bilbao
Born in Vitoria-Gasteiz, Álava, Zubizarreta spent his childhood in Aretxabaleta in Gipuzkoa, where he began his football career. After a brief passage at another Basque club, Deportivo Alavés, he joined Athletic Bilbao, where he would spend the following six seasons.

Zubizarreta's debut in La Liga occurred on 19 September 1981 as manager Javier Clemente handed him a start in a 2–0 away loss against Atlético Madrid, one month shy of his 20th birthday. He went on to be an undisputed starter for the remainder of his spell, being an instrumental part in the team's conquests, most notably the back-to-back national championships.

Barcelona
In 1986, Zubizarreta signed with FC Barcelona for a record for a player in the position €1.7 million, quickly removing established Urruti from the starting lineup and rarely missing a match afterwards – for example, only four in the Catalans' four consecutive league wins combined. He added their first ever European Cup in 1992, following a 1–0 win over U.C. Sampdoria.

Valencia
After the 1993–94 UEFA Champions League, where Barça lost 0–4 to A.C. Milan in the final, Zubizarreta was deemed surplus to requirements and finished his career at Valencia CF, still playing at a high level. He retired after the 1997–98 campaign at nearly 37, having played in over 1,000 competitive games (622 in the league alone – the all-time record – conceding 626 goals).

Director
Zubizarreta was named Barcelona's director of football by president Sandro Rosell on 2 July 2010, taking over from former club and national teammate Txiki Begiristain. Over the previous decade, he had served in the same capacity at Athletic Bilbao, while also working as a radio and television commentator.

On 5 January 2015, Zubizarreta was sacked as Barcelona director of football by club president Josep Maria Bartomeu. On 27 October 2016, he signed with Ligue 1 side Olympique de Marseille in the same capacity, leaving four years later by mutual consent.

International career
Zubizarreta made his debut for Spain on 23 January 1985, in a 3–1 friendly victory with Finland. He went on to collect a further 125 caps in the following 13 years.

Zubizarreta represented the nation in four consecutive FIFA World Cups: 1986, 1990, 1994 and 1998 – his last competition, where he scored an own goal in a 2–3 group stage loss against Nigeria– also appearing, always as a starter, at UEFA Euro 1988 and 1996. He and his deputy Francisco Buyo once held the national team record for the longest unbeaten run in international games, until Iker Casillas and Pepe Reina broke that record in October 2008; he was also surpassed by the former in total of caps on 15 November 2011.

Zubizarreta also played matches with the unofficial Basque Country regional side.

Style of play
Nicknamed "Zubi" throughout his career, Zubizarreta was regarded as one of the best goalkeepers in the world in his prime, and was considered to be one of Spain's and Barcelona's greatest and most successful goalkeepers ever. He was highly consistent, level-headed and effective, with an excellent positional sense above all things, and he favoured an efficient rather than spectacular style although he was also capable of producing decisive saves due to his good shot-stopping abilities. He also stood out for his intelligence, composure and charismatic leadership in goal, which enabled him to organise his back-line and inspire a sense of calm and confidence in his defenders; he was also known for his work-rate and longevity, as well as his ability to rush off his line.

In spite of Barcelona's passing-based playing style under Johan Cruyff, which also saw his defenders and goalkeepers given more responsibilities in terms of retaining possession and playing the ball out from the back, Zubizarreta was not particularly adept with the ball at his feet. His limited technical skills were a frequent source of criticism from his manager, and eventually led to the former's departure from the club in 1994.

Career statistics

Club

International

Honours
Athletic Bilbao
La Liga: 1982–83, 1983–84
Copa del Rey: 1983–84
Supercopa de España: 1984

Barcelona
La Liga: 1990–91, 1991–92, 1992–93, 1993–94
Copa del Rey: 1987–88, 1989–90
Supercopa de España: 1991, 1992
European Cup: 1991–92
UEFA Cup Winners' Cup: 1988–89
UEFA Super Cup: 1992

Individual
Don Balón Award: 1987
Zamora Trophy: 1986–87

See also 
 List of men's footballers with 100 or more international caps
 List of men's footballers with the most official appearances
 List of Athletic Bilbao players (+200 appearances)
 List of FC Barcelona players (100+ appearances)
 List of La Liga players (400+ appearances)

References

External links

CiberChe biography and stats 

1961 births
Living people
Footballers from Vitoria-Gasteiz
Spanish footballers
Association football goalkeepers
La Liga players
Segunda División B players
Deportivo Alavés B players
Deportivo Alavés players
Bilbao Athletic footballers
Athletic Bilbao footballers
FC Barcelona players
Valencia CF players
Spain youth international footballers
Spain under-21 international footballers
Spain amateur international footballers
Spain international footballers
UEFA Euro 1984 players
1986 FIFA World Cup players
UEFA Euro 1988 players
1990 FIFA World Cup players
1994 FIFA World Cup players
UEFA Euro 1996 players
1998 FIFA World Cup players
Basque Country international footballers
FIFA Century Club
Athletic Bilbao non-playing staff
FC Barcelona non-playing staff
Olympique de Marseille non-playing staff
Spanish expatriate sportspeople in France